The East Korea Warm Current (동한난류, 東韓暖流) is an ocean current in the Sea of Japan (East Sea). It branches off from the Tsushima Current at the eastern end of the Korea Strait, and flows north along the southeastern coast of the Korean Peninsula. Between 36° and 38° N, it encounters the North Korea Cold Current and veers southeast into the open sea.  The boundary between the two currents fluctuates throughout the year, creating large eddies. As it flows northeastward, the East Korea current eventually rejoins the Tsushima Current. It's very hot and rainy in the summer.

See also
Geography of South Korea

Geography of Korea
Currents of the Pacific Ocean